The 2016 Missouri State Bears football team represented Missouri State University in the 2016 NCAA Division I FCS football season. They were led by second-year head coach Dave Steckel and played their home games at the Plaster Sports Complex. They were a member of the Missouri Valley Football Conference. They finished the season 4–7, 2–6 in MVFC play to finish in a three-way tie for eighth place.

Schedule

Game summaries

Southwestern (KS)

at Murray State

at Kansas State

Game called at halftime due to weather.

at Indiana State

North Dakota State

Western Illinois

at Northern Iowa

Southern Illinois

at South Dakota State

at Illinois State

Youngstown State

References

Missouri State
Missouri State Bears football seasons
Missouri State Bears football